Vidyadhar Pasusa Johrapurkar (born 1935) is a Sanskritist, social anthropologist and historian. His name is sometimes spelt as Vidyadhar Pasusa Joharapurkar. He specializes in Jainism and Jain philosophy. 

Prof. Dr. Vidyadhar Pasusa Johrapurkar is from Nagpur. He finished his M.A. in 1956 and Ph.D. in 1959, both from Nagpur University. He worked as Professor of Sanskrit at the Department of Education, Government of Madhya Pradesh. He taught Sanskrit at the Graduate and Post-Graduate level at Government Colleges in Nagpur, Jabalpur, Jaora, Mandala and Bhopal. He retired as Professor and Head, Department of Sanskrit at Government College, Seoni, Madhya Pradesh.

As a child, Johrapurkar was inspired to read by his grandfather Nemasav's personal library. As a youth, he joined the Jain Svayamsevak Sangh and thus entered the field of social service. His friend Prof Dr Shantikumar Killedar instigated his study of Indian history and social anthropology.

Nearly 100 of his scholarly articles have been published in magazines such as Sanmati and Anekanta. He was interviewed more than once by Nagpur Doordarshan and Radio Nagpur.

His book Bhattaraka-Sampradaya provides a reconstruction of the Digambar Jain monastic lineages using compilations of Jain inscriptions and has been widely used as a reference.

Scholar and writer
Here is a list of the books written/edited by Vidyadhar Johrapurkar:
YASHASTILAKA - Hindi Kathasara  (Abridged Hindi version of the Yashastilaka)
TILAKAMANJARI- Hindi Kathasara (Abridged Hindi version of Dhanapala's Tilakamanjari)
BHATTARAKA SAMPRADAYA (Research work on historical and anthropological grounds, based on Digambara  Jain Bhattarakas published by Jain Sanskriti Sanrakshak Sangh, Solapur in 1958)
DHARMAMRTA (Study of a 15th Century Marathi work on Jainism)
JINA-SAGARA KAVITA (Compilation of 18th century Marathi devotional poetry)
TIRTHAVANDANASAMGRAHA (Collection of essays on Jain Tirthas published by Jain Sanskriti Sanrakshak Sangh, Solapur in 1965)
VISHVA-TATTVA PRAKASHA by Bhavasena Traividya (Hindi translation of a 13th-century Sanskrit work, published by Jain Sanskriti Sanrakshak Sangh, Solapur in 1964)
PRAMAPRAMEYA by Bhavasena Traividya (Hindi translation of a 13th-century Sanskrit work on formal logic)
JAIN SHILALEKHA SAMGRAHA part 4 (Compilation and Critical Study of Jain epigraphy published by Bharatiya Jnanapitha, New Delhi)
JAIN SHILALEKHA SAMGRAHA part 5 (Compilation and Critical Study of Jain epigraphy published by Bharatiya Jnanapitha, New Delhi)
KUVALAYAMALA - Marathi Kathasara (Abridged Marathi version of the Prakrit classic Kuvalayamala)
SVAYAMBHUSTOTRA (Marathi translation of Acarya Samantabhadra's Svayambhustotra)
VIRA SHASANA KE PRABHAVAKA ACARYA - Purvardha (Historical research on early and medieval Jain monks published by Bharatiya Jnanapitha, New Delhi in 1975)
VIVEKA VILASA (Translation of a 15th-century Gujarati text)
BHAGAVAN MAHAVIRA (Short Introduction in Hindi on Jina Mahavira)
BHAGAVAN MAHAVIRA (Short Introduction in Marathi on Jina Mahavira)
PRACINA MARATHI KATHAPANCAKA (Adaptation of 17th & 18th century Marathi short stories)
MARATHI JAIN SAHITYA (Published as part of JAIN SAHITYA KA BRHAD ITIHASA part 7, published by Parshvanatha Vidyapitha, Varanasi)
BAGHERVAL JATI KA ITIHASA (Historical study of the Bagherval Jain community, published by Akhil Bharatiya Digambara Jain Bagherval Sangh, Kota in 2001)

See also
 Balatkara Gana
 Bhattaraka

References

External links
 http://connemara.tnopac.gov.in/cgi-bin/koha/opac-search.pl?q=au%3AJOHRAPURKAR
 http://connemara.tnopac.gov.in/cgi-bin/koha/opac-search.pl?q=au:JOHARAPURKAR
 https://openlibrary.org/authors/OL5275041A/Vidyadhar_P._Johrapurkar
 https://books.google.com/books/about/Tirthavandanasamgraha.html?id=20xIAAAAMAAJ
 https://books.google.com/books?id=cAoLg0R1jZIC&pg=PA300&lpg=PA300&dq=vidyadhar+johrapurkar&source=bl&ots=QIQiOGLsJw&sig=V_v37L-LtCgmLUGOylTCKqrLmYY&hl=en&ei=ECnBTrDJKYjOrQe3-73eAQ&sa=X&oi=book_result&ct=result&resnum=7&ved=0CFEQ6AEwBg#v=onepage&q=vidyadhar%20johrapurkar&f=false
 https://openlibrary.org/authors/OL6845A/Vidyadhar_Pasusa_Joharapurkar
 http://www.jainworld.com/society/jainevents/Itihas%20Parishad.htm
 http://www.jainsamaj.org/magazines/ahimsatimesshow.php?id=184

1935 births
Living people
Social anthropologists
Scholars from Nagpur
20th-century Indian Jains
21st-century Indian Jains